The Fyrish Monument is a monument built in 1782 on Fyrish Hill, in Fyrish in Evanton, near Alness, Easter Ross, Scotland, on the orders of Sir Hector Munro, 8th of Novar, a native lord of the area who had served in India as a general. As the local population were being cleared off the land they had worked for centuries by the Lords of the Land, survival was a problem and so it was built to keep the locals in labour. It was said that Sir Hector rolled stones from the top of the hill to the bottom, thereby extending the amount of time worked and paying the labourers for additional hours.

It represents the Gate of Negapatam, a port in Madras, India, which General Munro took for the British in 1781. It is visible from almost anywhere in the parishes of Kiltearn and Alness.

The site of the monument provides an extensive view over the Cromarty Firth and beyond, and Ben Wyvis can be seen clearly, especially impressive if snow-covered. A path to the top starts at a car park northeast of the hill at OS grid NH627715.

References

Sources
https://web.archive.org/web/20061002181022/http://www.clanmunro.org.uk/merchandise_files/maps.htm
Touring Guide Scotland, p. 151.

External links

 Map from Streetmap.co.uk
 Route to the monument from Walkhighlands

Buildings and structures in Highland (council area)
Monuments and memorials in Scotland
Ross and Cromarty
Tourist attractions in Highland (council area)
Category B listed buildings in Highland (council area)
Folly buildings in Scotland